Fright Fest or FrightFest may refer to: 

Six Flags Fright Fest, a Halloween event at Six Flags parks.
FrightFest (film festival), a British film festival, also known as Film4 Fright Fest.
"FrightFest", a Halloween event at the Elitch Gardens Theme Park.
Fangoria FrightFest, a defunct online film festival sponsored by Fangoria magazine.
Shaefer's FrightFest, a Haunted attraction (simulated) in Flemington, New Jersey.